The 2016 CIS Women's Volleyball Championship was held March 11–13, 2016, in Brandon, Manitoba, to determine a national champion for the 2015–16 CIS women's volleyball season. The tournament was played at the Healthy Living Centre and hosted by Brandon University. It was the first time that Brandon had hosted the tournament and coincided with the 10th anniversary of the Brandon Bobcats volleyball program.

The OUA Champion Toronto Varsity Blues completed a perfect 25–0 season by defeating the defending champion Trinity Western Spartans in the gold medal match 3–0 to claim the first women's volleyball national championship in program history. The Varsity Blues were the first team with an undefeated record over the course of the regular season and post-season since the 2010 UBC Thunderbirds. They were also the first OUA team to win the championship since the 1976 Western Mustangs and just the second OUA program to claim a national championship title.

Participating teams

Championship bracket

Consolation bracket

References

External links 
 Tournament Web Site

U Sports volleyball
2016 in women's volleyball
Brandon University